The Chinese Basketball Association (CBA) Best Defender Award is an annual Chinese Basketball League (CBA) award given since the 2008–09 season. The main criteria for the award is that the player must attain either of the following: highest blocks per game average, highest steals per game or at least accumulated a high average of steals and blocks. The awardee is selected from players voted into the all-defensive quintet team.

List of Recipients

Multiple time winners

References

External links